Performance Research is a specialist performance art journal published bi-monthly (from 2012).

It is an independent, peer-reviewed journal published by Routledge Journals, Taylor & Francis Ltd for ARC, a division of the Centre for Performance Research Ltd, an educational charity limited by guarantee. It is based at the Academy of Music and Theatre Arts at Falmouth University.

Performance Research was founded in 1995 by Ric Allsopp, Richard Gough and Claire MacDonald.

Performance Research Books 

Performance Research Books is an independent venture of Performance Research journal and an imprint of ARC, a division of the Centre for Performance Research Ltd.

Performance Research Books follows and expands the policy of the journal, but opens into publishing monographs, bookworks, and singular works on distinctive practice.

Publications include:

 Good Luck Everybody: Lone Twin - Journeys, Performances, Conversations, 2011 (eds. Carl Lavery and David Williams) 
 We're People Who Do Shows: Back to Back Theatre - Performance, Politics, Visibility, 2013 (eds. Helena Grehan and Peter Eckersall) 
 Worlds, Bodies, Matters: Theatre of the Late Twentieth Century by Valentina Valentini, 2014 (trans. Thomas Haskell Simpson) 

Projects in process include: BADco (Croatia), Ong Keng Sen/TheatreWorks (Singapore), Alicia Rios (Spain).

External links 
Performance Research on the Taylor and Francis/Routledge website
Performance Research on the *Centre for Performance Research website
"Performance Research" official website.

Visual arts magazines
Publications established in 1995